Ivanovskaya is a railway station of the October railway[1][2], located in Otradnoye (suburb of Saint Petersburg), Russia. It was opened in 1918[3]. The station is located 33 km from Moscow Station (the main station in St. Petersburg) on the Sapernaya - Pella stretch, the St. Petersburg - Volkhovstroy line.
There are two platforms at the station which receive electric trains 12 carriages long. There is also a ticket office.

Gallery

References 

1. Station directory | Freight transportation

2. Ivanovskaya | Railroad station. Reference (inaccessible link). TransLogistic.ru. Retrieved May 22, 2013. Archived May 18, 2014.

3. Railway stations of the USSR. Directory. - M., Transport, 1981

External links

 От Выборга до Новгорода: Каталог станций. СПб., 1998. p. 71.(English: From Vyborg to Novgorod: Catalog of stations. SPb., 1998.S. 71.

 Платформа Ивановская на Викимапии(English:Ivanovskaya platform on Wikimapia)

Electric train schedule

 Расписание электропоездов на сайте tutu.ru(English: Schedule of electric trains on the website tutu.ru)

Railway stations in Russia opened in 1918
Railway stations in Saint Petersburg Railway Division